The Progressive Union was a political party in Greece in the 1920s and 1930s.

History
The party first contested national elections in 1928, winning five seats in the parliamentary elections with 1.3% of the vote. In the Senate elections the following year the party won two seats, but did not contest any further elections.

References

Defunct political parties in Greece